Taleb Moussa (born 1 July 1978) is an Emirati chess player. He was the UAE's first professional chess player and first grandmaster, a title he earned in 2004. He won the Emirati Chess Championship in 2001 and 2003.

In 2005, Taleb Moussa obtained a substantial sponsorship of Dh5.7 million.

References

External links

Moussa Taleb at 365Chess.com

1978 births
Living people
Emirati chess players
Chess grandmasters
Chess players at the 2006 Asian Games
Asian Games competitors for the United Arab Emirates